Eresia is a genus of butterflies from Mexico to South America in the family Nymphalidae. Eresia forms complex mimicry rings with Heliconiinae and Ithomiinae.

Species
Listed alphabetically:
Eresia actinote Salvin, 1869
Eresia carme Doubleday, [1847]
Eresia casiphia Hewitson, 1869 – three-banded crescent
Eresia clio (Linnaeus, 1758) – creamy crescent, Clio crescent, common crescent
Eresia datis Hewitson, 1864 – Datis crescent, Hewitson's Mimic
Eresia emerantia Hewitson, 1857 – Emerantia crescent
Eresia erysice (Geyer, 1832)
Eresia estebana (Hall, 1929)
Eresia eunice (Hübner, [1807]) – Eunice crescent, tiger crescent (type for the genus)
Eresia ithomioides Hewitson, 1864 – three-banded crescent, ithomioides crescent, variable crescent
Eresia letitia Hewitson, 1869
Eresia nauplius (Linnaeus, 1758) – Peruvian crescent, Nauplius crescent
Eresia lansdorfi (Godart, 1819) – Lansdorf's crescent
Eresia levina Hewitson, 1872
Eresia olivencia Bates, 1864
Eresia pelonia Hewitson, 1852 – mimic crescent, Polina crescent
Eresia perna Hewitson, 1852
Eresia phillyra Hewitson, 1852 – square-tipped crescent
Eresia polina Hewitson, 1852 – Polina crescent
Eresia sticta Schaus, 1913

References

Melitaeini
Nymphalidae of South America
Butterfly genera
Taxa named by Jean Baptiste Boisduval